Elrama is a census-designated place located in Union Township, Washington County in the state of Pennsylvania.  The community is located in far eastern tip of Union Township in Washington County, near the Monongahela River, along Pennsylvania Route 837.  As of the 2010 census the population was 307 residents.

Demographics

References

Census-designated places in Washington County, Pennsylvania
Pennsylvania populated places on the Monongahela River
Census-designated places in Pennsylvania